The following is a list of the prominent islets or volcanic stacks in the archipelago of the Azores:

Corvo

 Ilhéu de Lagoinhas

Flores

 Ilhéu Maria Vaz
 Ilhéu do Monchique
 Ilhéu Alagado

Graciosa

 Ilhéu da Praia
 Ilhéu de Baixo
 Ilhéu da Baleia
 Ilhéu da Gaivota
 Ilhéu do Navio
 Ilhéus do Barro Vermelho
 Ilhéus da Ponta da Barca

Pico

 Ilhéus da Madalena
 Ilhéu Delgado
 Ilhéu Escamirro
 Ilhéu Pesqueiro
 Ilhéu das Moças

São Jorge

 Ilhéus dos Rosais
 Ilhéu do Topo

São Miguel

 Ilha Sabrina (historic)
 Ilhéus dos Mosteiros
 Ilhéu de Vila Franca
 Ilhéu de Rosto de Cão

Santa Maria

 Ilhéu da Vila
 Ilhéu de Lagoinhas
 Ilhéus das Formigas

Terceira

 Ilhéus das Cabras
 Fradinhos
 Ilhéu do Norte

References
 
 
 
 
 
 

islets